Anne Cecile Polinario (born 5 August 1979) is a S10 classified Canadian para-swimmer. Born to parents on Cuba's national swim team, she caught on and was on Canada's National Team. Polinario has competed at the 2000, 2004 and 2008 Paralympic Games.

Personal life 

Polinario was born on 5 August 1979 in Havana, Cuba and now resides in Montreal, Quebec. She had Drop Foot Paralysis in her left foot at birth. She started swimming at a young age and moved to Canada as a teenager. She made it into Canada's national swimming team while her mother and father were in Cuba's National Swimming Team.

Career 
Polinario's headed for here first Paralympic games in 2000 Sydney, where she won three bronze medals in 100m Backstroke, 100m Freestyle, and 50m Freestyle. In 2004 Athens, she won 3 gold and 2 silver."I was pretty happy. I had a bit of tears in my eyes. It was pretty emotional for sure." she said as she won her first Paralympic Gold Medal. In 2008, Polinario's final Paralympic game, she competed in three races but had only won one medal, a gold. "I was disappointed with my first two races so I'm glad to finish with a victory, It was a very good race for me. But I'll need to work harder to get that world record." she said.

References 

1979 births
Paralympic gold medalists for Canada
Paralympic silver medalists for Canada
Paralympic bronze medalists for Canada
Canadian female backstroke swimmers
Canadian female freestyle swimmers
Sportspeople from Havana
Swimmers from Montreal
Living people
Medalists at the 2000 Summer Paralympics
Medalists at the 2004 Summer Paralympics
Medalists at the 2008 Summer Paralympics
Swimmers at the 2000 Summer Paralympics
Swimmers at the 2004 Summer Paralympics
Swimmers at the 2008 Summer Paralympics
S10-classified Paralympic swimmers
Paralympic medalists in swimming
Paralympic swimmers of Canada